Lambert Schlechter (born 1941) is a Luxembourg author who has published some 40 books written in French, most of them published in France and two written in German published in Luxembourg. His work includes poetry, novels, short stories and essays. A great number of contributions to newspapers, magazines and anthologies in different countries. Since 2006 he is working on a greater prose project under the general title "Le Murmure du monde": a collection of literary, philosophical and autobiographical fragments; so far nine volumes have been published (see below: Works), X, XI and XII are in preparation.

Biography
Born on 4 December 1941 in Luxembourg City, Schlechter studied philosophy and literature in Paris and Nancy before teaching philosophy, French language and literature at the Lycée Classique in Echternach. His first works, Das große Rasenstück (1981), a collection of poems, and Buntspecht im Hirn (1982), in prose, were followed by articles, short stories (Partances, 2003) and novels (Le silence inutile, 1991) in French. He was vice-president of the Luxembourg section of Amnesty International, Luxembourg, representative in the International Service for Human Rights in Geneva, member of the Société des écrivains luxembourgeois de langue française (SELF), president of the Conseil national du livre.

He has been invited to more than hundred Literature & Poetry Festivals all over the world. (see details in the special section in the French version of Wikipedia). Some of his books were translated in Armenia, Bulgaria, Italy, Spain, Mexico and Bosnia.

In April 2015 his house in Eschweiler (Luxembourg) was destroyed by a huge blast, thousands of books and nearly all his manuscripts were annihilated.
A photographic documentation on the destruction of the library was published in the on-line newspaper Luxembourg Times.

Works
 Das grosse Rasenstück, poems, Éditions Guy Binsfeld, Luxembourg, 1981
 La muse démuselée, poems, Éditions phi, Echternach, (Luxembourg), 1982 
 Buntspecht im Hirn, prose, collection MOL, Differdange (Luxembourg), 1982
 Angle mort, le livret de la cambuse, Éditions phi, Echternach (Luxembourg), 1988 
 Pieds de mouche, Éditions phi, Echternach (Luxembourg), 1990 
 Le silence inutile, novel, Éditions phi, Echternach (Luxembourg), 1991 
 Ruine de parole, novel, Éditions phi, Luxembourg, 1993 
 Honda rouge et cent pigeons, poem, Éditions phi, 1994 
 Partances, short stories, Éditions L'Escampette, Bordeaux, 2003 
 Smoky, Éditions Le Temps qu'il fait, Cognac, 2003 
 Le papillon de Solutré, Éditions phi, Luxembourg, 2003 
 Le monde immodérément, with Valérie Rouzeau, Éditions nuit myrtide, Lille, 2004 
 Le murmure du monde, Éditions Le Castor Astral, 2006, (Prix Servais 2007) 
 Ici c'est comme nulle part, Éditions bibliophiles Transignum, Paris, 2007
 Petits travaux dans la maison, Éditions phi, Luxembourg, 2008 
 Pourquoi le merle de Breughel n'est peut-être qu'un corbeau, Éditions Estuaires, Luxembourg, 2008 
 La robe de nudité, Éditions des Vanneaux, Collection Amorosa, 2008 
 L'envers de tous les endroits, Éditions phi, Collection graphiti, 2010 
 La trame des jours, (Le murmure du monde 2), Éditions des Vanneaux, 2010 
 Les repentirs de Froberger (dessins Nicolas Maldague), Éditions La part des anges, 2011 
 La pivoine de Cervantès, Éditions La part commune, 2011 
 Lettres à Chen Fou, Éditions L'Escampette, 2011 
 Piéton sur la voie lactée, petites parleries au fil des jours, neuvains, Éditions phi, coll. graphiti, 2012, 
 Enculer     la camarde, petites parleries au fil des     jours 2, 99     neuvains, illustré par 12 photoworks de Lysiane Schlechter,poemsn  Éditions phi, coll. graphiti, 2013, 
 Le Fracas des nuages,     (Le murmure du monde 3), prose fragments, Éditions Le Castor Astral, 2013, 
 Je est un pronom sans conséquence, petites parleries au fil des     jours 3, 99 neuvains, poems, Éditions phi, coll.     graphiti, 2014, 
 Nichts kapiert, doch alles notiert, Lyrik & Prosa 1968–2014, éditions Guy Binsfeld, 2014, 
 Con de fée,     poèmes, avec neuf sérigraphies de Robert Brandy, Redfoxpress, Irlande,     2015
 La Théorie de l'univers, distiques décasyllabiques, éditions phi, coll. graphiti, 2015, 
 Inévitables bifurcations, (Le murmure du monde 4), fragments, éditions Les Doigts dans la prose, 2016,  
 Milliards de manières de mourir, 99 neuvains, IVe série, éditions phi, coll. graphiti, 2016,
 Le Ressac du temps, (Le murmure du monde 5), éditions Les Vanneaux, 2016,
 Monsieur Pinget saisit le râteau et traverse le potager, (Le murmure du monde / 6), éditions phi, 2017,
 Une mite sous la semelle du Titien, proseries, (Le Murmure du monde / 7), éditions Tinbad, 2018,
 Agonie Patagonie, 99 neuvains, Ve série, éditions phi, coll. graphiti, 2018,
 Mais le merle n'a aucun message, 99 neuvains, illustrated by Lysiane Schlechter, éditions phi, 2020, (ISBN 978-2-019791-43-9)
 Wendelin et les autres, 16 short stories illustrated by Lysiane Schlechter, éditions L'Herbe qui tremble, 2021, (ISBN 9782491462321)

 Prizes and distinctions 
 1981 Prix du Concours littéraire national for De bello gallico
 1986 Prix du Concours littéraire national for Angle mort
 2007 Mention spéciale du jury lors du Grand prix Léopold Sédar Senghor (lauréat Guy Goffette)
 2007 Prix Servais for Le murmure du monde
 2010 Prix Birago Diop, Salon international des Poètes francophones, Bénin
 2013 Premio alla Carriera, Festival Internazionale di Poesia Civile, Vercelli (Italia)
 2014 Batty Weber Prize, for the entire work 
 2015 Premio internazionale NordSud, Fondazione Pescarabruzzo, Pescara, Italie

Since 2001 Chevalier des Arts et des Lettres, France

 Nominations 
 1994 finalist for Prix international de francophonie Yvan-Goll (laureate: Werner Lambersy)
 2005 nominated for Prix des Découvreurs (laureates: Ludovic Degroote et Olivier Barbarant)
 2006 nominated for Lo Stellato – Premio Internazionale di Narrativa, Salerno – contribution in the anthology of the twelve nominated authors "Le parole dei luoghi", edizioni Marlin, Salerno, 2006

 Books in translation English:
 One Day I will Write a Poem, selected poems, Black Fountain Press, Luxembourg, 2018, Armenian :
 Le papillon de Solutré, translation Alexandre Toptchyan, éditions Lusabats, Erevan, 2008
 Petits travaux dans la maison, translation Alexandre Toptchyan, éditions Lusabats, Erevan, 2010
  Honda rouge et cent pigeons, translation Alexandre Toptchyan, éditions Lusabats, Erevan, 2011Italian :
 All'opposto di ogni posto (traduction de L’envers de tous les endroits), translation and preface by Clemente Condello, bilingue, edizioni interlinea, Novara, 2013,  Prix en 2013: Premio alla Carriera, Festival Internazionale di Poesia Civile, Vercelli (Italia)Bulgarian :
 Piéton sur la voie lactée. Poèmes choisis, translation Aksinia Mihailova, Foundation for Bulgarian Literature, Sofia, 2013, Spanish and Bosnian in preparation

A certain number of single poems translated (in anthologies and magazines) into Russian, Slovenian, Croatian, Bosnian, Spanish, German, Rumanian Contributions in anthologies and magazines 
 Réverbères et phalènes, poème, in: Lëtzebuerger Land, 1960, No1
 Selbst- & heterokritisches Prosa-Stück über das Drum & Dran des Unbehagens, Doppelpunkt, Nr 2, 1968, S. 17–21
 Le premier mot, prose, in: Nouvelles Pages de la Self (Société des écrivains luxembourgeois de langue française), No 7, 1978
 Celui qui / Ecrire, prose, in: Nouvelles Pages de la SELF, No 8, 1980
 L'écriture l'érection, prose, in Nouvelles Pages de la Self, No 9, 1981
 La septième mort, prose, in Nouvelles Pages de la SELF, No 10, 1982
 Der Fährmann / Die Töpferin, in "Schriftbilder, Neue Prosa aus Luxemburg", Éditions Guy Binsfeld, (Luxembourg), 1984
 Das Sternbild und die Wildsau, in "Nach Berlin", Autorenverlag, (Luxembourg), 1984
 Le monde anémone, prose, in: Almanach 1985, éditions Binsfeld, 1984
 Pattes d'oie et points d'orgue, proses, in: Nouvelles Pages de la SELF, No 11, 1984
 De bello gallico, nouvelle, in: revue Ré/Création, No 1, 1985
 Johann Sebastian und die Daumenschraube, in "In Sachen Papst, Texte zum Papstbesuch in Luxemburg 1985", Autorenverlag, (Luxembourg), 1985
 Gott mit uns – und ohne mich, in: Galerie, 1986, Nr 4
 Les treize notes définitives, proses, in: Nouvelles pages de la Self, No 12-13, 1986
 Le mâle entendu, Texticules, dans "Lustich, Texte zur Sexualität", Autorenverlag, (Luxembourg), 1987
 Kleine Gespräche mit Eugenio, in Poésie Internationale, Éditions Guy Binsfeld, (Luxembourg), 1987
 Chevrotements, prose, in: Almanach 1986, éditions Binsfeld, 1987
 Et soudain page blanche pour le remorque de Niort, prose, in: Estuaires, 1988, No5
 Les trois O d'Oblomov, prose, in: Cahiers luxembourgeois, 1989, No 1
 Kirchenleere oder Fisch auf heissem Sand, Essay, in: "Neue Gespräche", Heft 1/1989, Paderborn // "Forum" Nr 111, April 1989, Luxemburg
 Cahier du 6e mois, fragments, in: Cahiers luxembourgeois, 1989, No 5
 Le vrac du temps d'aphasie, fragments, in: Les Cahiers luxembourgeois, 1990, No2
 Abrégé du petit jour, dans L'année nouvelle, 71 nouvelles, Canevas éditeur / Les Éperonniers / L'instant même / Éditions phi, (Luxembourg), 1993
 Corps encore ou Rien à voir, essay on the nude photographs by Wolfgang Osterheld, Revue Estuaires, No 20, Luxembourg,1993
 Bréviaire du temps réel, in Europe, revue littéraire mensuelle, avril 1995
 Le champ de l'ignorable / Les délires sont dangereux / l'égratignure / les franges inoffensives, proses, dans : Regards d'écrivains, éditions Le Phare, 1995
 Les aquarelles du caporal, in Frontière belge, Éditions de l'Aube, 1996
 Rubrique des grabataires, prose, in: Le Paresseux, No 10, 1996
 Ticket pour ailleurs, dans Des trains passent la frontière, Éditions de L'Aube, 1997
 Jamais je n'ai eu soif autant, in Histoires d'eaux, Le Castor Astral, 1998
 Quand / Ecrire, dans Au fil du temps, Le Castor Astral, 1999
 Lapsus encore / Onze chances sur douze, dans Douze auteurs luxembourgeois, Éditions phi / Journées littéraires de Mondorf, 1999
 J’écris pour le jour, textes extraits de Ruine de parole et Honda rouge et cent pigeons, dans Poésie, Anthologie luxembourgeoise, (présentation by Jean Portante), Écrits des Forges (Québec) et Éditions phi (Luxembourg), 1999
 Offrande pour bongo & clavicorde, dans Cahiers francophones d’Europe Centre-orientale, La francophonie du Grand-Duché de Luxembourg par Frank Wilhelm, Université Janus Pannonius, Pécs, (Hongrie), 1999
 Ici c'est comme nulle part, dans Poète toi-même / 40 poètes, une anthologie de poésie contemporaine, Le Castor Astral, 2000
 vom weiss der worte / nachricht, (aus: Das grosse Rasenstück, 1981), in: "Deutschsprachige Lyrik in Luxemburg", Institut Grand-Ducal, Section des Arts et des Lettres, 2002
 Noircir de nuit la blanche feuille, in "Virum wäisse Blat", des auteurs luxembourgeois écrivent sur l’écriture, (textes en luxembourgeois, allemand et français), avec photos de Philippe Matsas (agence Opale), Éditions Guy Binsfeld,(Luxembourg), 2003
 Le paysage à travers la littérature, anthologie, auteurs des 46 pays du Conseil de l’Europe, numéro spécial de Naturopa No 103 / 2005, Conseil de l’Europe, Strasbourg
 Je me souviens de Bruxelles, Dix-neuf auteurs se racontent en ville, Escales du Nord, Le Castor Astral, 2006
 Plus juillet que ça tu meurs, anthologie Au jour le jour, textes rassemblés par Corina Ciocârlie, collection aphinités, Éditions phi, (Luxembourg), 2006
 'Il seminatore di parole, (Le semeur de paroles, nouvelle traduite par Stefania Ricciardi), dans "Le parole dei luoghi", anthologie des auteurs nominés au "Premio Stellato", edizioni Marli, Salerno, Italie, 2006
 Rabiot dans les jours, dix textes en prose, dans: Neige d’août, revue de littérature & d’Extrême-Orient, No 15 automne 2006, 58210 Champlemy, France
 Le murmure du monde, extraits dans L’année poétique 2007, présenté par Patrice Delbourg et Jean-Luc Maxence, Éditions Seghers, Paris 2007
 La promesse de Wenders / Refuge exotique (avec une présentation de Jean-Pascal Dubost,) dans Gare maritime, revue (annuelle) écrite et sonore de poésie contemporaine, Maison de la poésie de Nantes, 2007
 Les repentirs de Froberger, quatrains, dans Littérature et peinture sauvages, Les coups de cœur de Pirotte, Les Amis des Ardennes, No 16, printemps 2007
 Question suspendue, in l’anthologie Au bout du bar, ouvrage coordonné par Jacques Josse, Éditions Apogée, Rennes, 2007
 Le silence inutile, excerpts translated into German by Georges Hausemer in l’anthologie "Völkerfrei" (Klaus Wiegerling, Hg.), Edition Krautgarten, St. Vith, Belgique, 2007
 La pèlerine syllabique pour protéger la pâle nudité, discours lors de la réception du Prix Servais, in: Prix Servais 2007, publication de la Fondation Servais, 2007
 Où demeurer ailleurs que là, anthologie éponyme, textes rassemblés par Corina Ciocârlie, Éditions phi, coll. aphinités, (Luxembourg) 2007
 Le traverseur du jour, dans Poésies de langue française, 144 poètes d’aujourd’hui autour du monde, anthologie présentée par Stéphane Bataillon, Sylvestre Clancier et Bruno Doucey, Éditions Seghers, 2008
 Nous ne savons rien de la lune, dans Espaces, fictions européennes, trente écrivains européens écrivent sur le thème de l’espace, un volume avec les contributions en langue originale avec traduction française et un volume en version anglaise, Observatoire de l’Espace / CNES, 2008
 L’épreuve, dans "Konterlamonter", 19 écrivains fantasment autour du sport, anthologie trilingue, textes rassemblés par Georges Hausemer, photographs by Jeanine Unsen, Éditions Guy Binsfeld, 2008, 
 Postface à Maram al-Masri, Je te menace d’une colombe blanche, Éditions Seghers, collection Autour du monde, 2008 
 Le tram de Beggen et autres micromythologèmes, dans "Wat mir sin", Petites mythologies du Grand-Duché, textes rassemblés par Corina Ciocârlie, Éditions phi, coll. aphinités, 2008,
 La promesse de Wenders et autres rédactions, cinq textes avec traduction en allemand par l’auteur, dans Park, № 63, Juni 2009, Zeitschrift für neue Literatur, Berlin,
 Moränen, Prosa-Text, in : Zwischenland ! Ausguckland!, Literarische Kurzprosa aus Luxemburg, Röhrig Universitätsverlag, 2009, 
 Un tas d’images brisées, dans : Jours enfantins au royaume du Luxembourg, textes rassemblés par Corina Ciocârlie, Éditions phi, coll. aphinités, 2010, 
 Ostinato, huit poèmes, dans Le Fram, revue semestrielle de littérature, № 21, printemps 2010
 Myriades d’anémones / L’encre c’est de la nuit liquide, deux poèmes, anthologie des poètes de « Voix vives de méditerranée en méditerranée, Sète », éditions Bruno Doucey, 2011
 Hola camarde, neuf nano scénarios, dans : Hasta la vista, Johnny !, anthologie sur le cinéma, édition Guy Binsfeld / Walfer Bicherdeeg, 2011
 Le fracas des nuages, fragments, 25 pages, in : Les moments littéraires, Revue de littérature, № 26, 2011, ISSN 1292-7406
 L’araignée rescapée, poème, in : anthologie Lesen in einem Zug / En train de lire / E Buch am Zug, Initiative Plaisir de lire / Centre national de littérature, 2011
 Amaryllis Treblinka, fragments, 16 pages, in : Première Ligne, revue littéraire, № 1, printemps 2012, 
 Choses à dire, poème, dans : Grandes Voix Francophones, 42 auteurs de la francophonie, édition Fondation Prince Amine Laourou, s.d. (2012)
 Le silence inutile / Le murmure du monde, 10 pages, in : Literaresch Welten, eng lëtzebuerger Anthologie an dräi Sproochen, Ministère de l’Education nationale et de le Formation professionnelle, Luxembourg, 2012
 Le timbalier de Salerne, et autres incidents plutôt mortifères, cinq nouvelles, in : Première Ligne, revue littéraire, № 2, automne 2012, 
 Six neuvains, avec traduction allemande par Bruno Karthäuser, in Krautgarten, № 61, November 2012
 La hache destroy, anthologie Perdus de vue, dans : Supplément livres, Tageblatt, № novembre-décembre 2012
 Deux neuvains, traduits en polonais par Urszula Kozioł, in Obra 2/2013, revue de littérature, Wroclaw, Pologne
 Sur le pavé de ma cour, la nuit, neuvain, anthologie "Momento nudo", 47 auteurs, éditions l'Arbre à parole, 2013, 
 A l'opposto di ogni posto, poèmes du livre éponyme (edizioni interlinea), avec préface de Clemente Condello, dans: Poesia, Mensile internazionale di cultura poetica, Milano, Anno XXVI, Novembre 2013, pp. 61–75
 Tomber tomber tomber, neuvains, Première Ligne, revue littéraire, No 3, automne 2013, pp. 120–130, 
 Neuvain pour A.P. [Anna Politkovskaïa], anthologie "Liberté de créer, liberté de crier", édité par le PEN Club français, éditions Les Ecrits du Nord / éditions Henry, 2014, 
 Vient l'été avec ses missives et ses mouches, neuvain, "Voix vives", anthologie Sète 2014, éditions Bruno Doucey, 2014, ISBN 9 782362 290695
 Cinq poèmes, traduits en slovène par Primož Vitez, anthologie slovène d'auteurs luxembourgeois "Hällewull", Društvo slovenskih pisateljev, Ljubljana, 2014, 
 La Théorie de l'Univers, 48 distiques décasyllabiques, La Revue des Archers, publication littéraire semestrielle – Juin 2014, pp. 106–111, 
 inaudible chuchotis / les insignifiances du moment / lascivité universelle, proseries, '''Le paresseux', journal de lectures littéraires, No 32, novembre 2014, ISSN 1249-6553
 Inévitables bifurcations, extraits: chapitres 4, 36, 45, 56, La Revue des Archers, publication littéraire semestrielle, décembre 2014, pp. 125–128, 
 Procès-verbal de l'ambulancier, quatrains, anthologie "Ce qui est écrit change à chaque instant", 101 poètes, éditions Le Castor astral, 2015, ISBN 9 791027 80039 1
 Une série de poèmes extraits de Honda rouge et cent pigeons et de Le Papillon de Solutré, in: "Scrie-acum, scrie", anthologie de poésie luxembourgeoise en langue roumaine, traduction par Philippe Blasen et Nora Chelaru, Casa Cărţii de Ştiinţă, Cluj-Napoca, Roumanie, 2015, 
 Sous la robedans "Les Vêtements dans la littérature au Luxermbourg", anthologie, Centre national de littérature / initiative Plaisir de lire, 2016
 Ce n'est pas ma langue, un neuvain, dans "Éloge et défense de la langue française", 137 poètes planétaires, 10 lettres ouvertes, 5 peintres, sous la direction de Pablo Poblete et Claudine Bertrand, éditions unicité, 2016,
 Fragments du journal intime de Dieu, dans "Les Cahiers luxembourgeois", 2016, No 1, p. 55-69, novembre 2016 69
 La hache destroy, dans "Perdus de vue", petite anthologie de la disparition, section grand-ducale, textes rassemblés par Corina Ciocârlie, éditions phi, collection aphinités, vol. 6, 2016, pp. 73–78,
 Gefeuert, dans "Gedanken reisen, Einfälle kommen an", Die Welt der Notiz, Periodikum "Sichtungen", 16./17. Jahrgang, herausgegeben im Auftrag des Literaturarchivs der Österreichischen Nationalbibliothek und der Wienbibliothek im Rathaus, von Marcel Atze und Volker Kaukoreit, Praesens Verlag, 2017, S. 93–102 (mit 4 Abbildungen), ISSN 1680-8975,
 Auf den Spuren von Gerhard Meier, périodique littéraire "Livres / Bücher", Tageblatt, mars-avril 2017
 Sur la raide corde danser, neuvain, "Voix vives", anthologie Sète 2017, éditions Bruno Doucey, 2017, (ISBN 9 78236 2291579)
 Les dépêches de Kliphuis, dix proseries, sur "Recours au poème", mars 2018

Bibliography
 Wilhelm, Frank: Schlechter, Lambert. p. 534 in: Goetzinger, Germaine & Claude D. Conter: 2007. Luxemburger Autorenlexikon'';  Publications nationales du Ministère de la culture. Centre national de littérature, Mersch, ò2007, 687 p. .

References

External links

 Le murmure du monde, his blog

Luxembourgian writers
1941 births
Luxembourgian novelists
People from Luxembourg City
Living people